The Sacred Heart of Jesus Cathedral Also Ciudad Obregón Cathedral Is a Catholic church seat of the Diocese of Ciudad Obregón, in Mexico, is one of the most recent Cathedrals of the country, since it was erected at the end of the 20th century. It is dedicated to the Sacred Heart of Jesus.

Of modern style, it emphasizes its enormous ceiling, in form of truncated prism, on which a great cross rises.

In the interior you can see an enormous altarpiece with images carved in marble and decorations with gold and bronze leaf.

See also
Roman Catholicism in Mexico
Sacred Heart Cathedral

References

Roman Catholic cathedrals in Mexico
Roman Catholic churches completed in 1979
20th-century Roman Catholic church buildings in Mexico